The Corona Formation is a geologic formation of the Carnian Alps at the border of Austria and Italy. It preserves fossils dated to the Gzhelian stage of the Late Carboniferous period.

The Corona Formation has provided fossils of fish, brachiopods, a bryozoan, an insect, fossil flora including trunks and ichnofossils ascribed to Limnopus. The tracks from the Corona Formation include the oldest record of tetrapod tracks from the Southern Alps. The rugose coral Amplexus coronae was named after the formation.

Description 
The Corona Formation was defined as a formation by Venturini in 1990. It is the lowermost Gzhelian unit in the late Pennsylvanian Pramollo Group, overlying the Kasimovian Pizzul Formation and overlain by the Auernig Formation in the Carnian Alpine border region of Austria and Italy. The mountains Monte Auernig, Monte Carnizza and the eponymous Monte Corona are composed of the formation. The conglomerates are coarse infillings of distributary channels in a deltaic environment.

Fossil content 
The Corona Formation has provided fossils of:
 Fish
 Petalodontiformes
 Petalodontidae
 Petalodus ohioensis
 Insects
 Palaeodictyoptera
 Dictyoneuridae
 Arltia carnica
 Rugose corals
 Zaphrentis omaliusi
 Lopholasma carbonaria
 Amplexus coronae
 Strophomenata
 Productida
 Rugosochonetidae
 Capillomesolobus pontebbanus
 Paramesolobus sp.
 Bryozoa
 Rhombocladia delicata
 Foraminifera
 Badyina lucida
 Hemidiscus sp.
 Ichnofossils
 Limnopus

The tracks of Limnopus from the Corona Formation represent the oldest record of tetrapod tracks from the Southern Alps.

Flora 
The genus Lebachia, typically known from the Permian, is not found in other Carboniferous strata in the Alps. The flora is of importance as one of the earliest examples of rebound after the Carboniferous rainforest collapse.

 Acitheca polymorpha
 Annularia carinata
 Anthracoporella sp.
 Calamites carinatus
 Lepidodendron cf. subdichotum
 Linopteris neuropteroides
 Neuropteris cordata
 Paripteris cf. linguaefolia
 Pseudomariopteris busquetii
 Alethopteris sp.
 Pecopteris sp.
 Polymorphopteris sp.

See also 

 List of fossiliferous stratigraphic units in Austria
 List of fossiliferous stratigraphic units in Italy
 Bajo de Véliz Formation, contemporaneous fossil flora-bearing formation of Argentina
 Ganigobis Formation, contemporaneous fossil fish-bearing formation of Namibia

References

Bibliography 

 
  
 
 
 
 
 
 
 
 

Geologic formations of Austria
Geologic formations of Italy
Carboniferous System of Europe
Carboniferous Austria
Carboniferous Italy
Pennsylvanian Series
Gzhelian
Conglomerate formations
Mudstone formations
Sandstone formations
Deltaic deposits
Ichnofossiliferous formations
Carboniferous northern paleotropical deposits
Paleontology in Austria
Paleontology in Italy
Geology of the Alps
Austria–Italy border